Pasi Nielikäinen (born 11 February 1974, Oulainen, Finland) is a former professional ice hockey player.

Playing career
Nielikäinen has played for numerous teams in the Finnish SM-liiga; these include Kärpät, HIFK and HPK.

Nielikäinen also played one season in East Coast Hockey League for the Miami Matadors and one season for the British team the Manchester Storm.

Style of play
Nielikäinen is not a usual Finnish hockey player when it comes to playing. Nielikäinen is known for serving as an enforcer for his team. Nielikäinen also is not shy when it comes to dropping gloves and scrapping on the ice.

Nielikäinen's most famous rivalries include the one with fellow SM-liiga player Sami Helenius and his single fight against NHL-enforcer Ryan Vandenbusche in the 2005/06 season for which HIFK and Jokerit got fined 15.000 euros/team.

Off the ice
Nielikäinen is married to former Finnish Beauty contestant Jenni Nielikäinen (née Anttila)

References

External links

1974 births
Living people
Finnish ice hockey right wingers
Ässät players
HIFK (ice hockey) players
HPK players
Jokerit players
Kiekko-Vantaa players
Manchester Storm (1995–2002) players
Oulun Kärpät players
People from Oulainen
Sportspeople from North Ostrobothnia